Frank Steve Balasz (January 23, 1918 – August 6, 1962) was a professional American football player for the Green Bay Packers and the Chicago Cardinals from 1939–1945. A member of the 1939 NFL Champion Packers, he played in the annual All-Star Game that year. He played at the collegiate level at the University of Iowa.

See also

Green Bay Packers players

External links

1918 births
1962 deaths
Players of American football from Chicago
American football fullbacks
American football linebackers
American football defensive backs
Iowa Hawkeyes football players
Green Bay Packers players
Chicago Cardinals players